The National Congress on Aviation and Space Education is an annual conference sponsored by Civil Air Patrol designed to enhance and expand educational opportunities and support for teachers throughout the United States. The event is co-sponsored with the Federal Aviation Administration and NASA.

External links 
 NCASE website
 Civil Air Patrol facsheet including information on NCASE

References 

Aviation organizations based in the United States